Clément Fabre (born 19 May 1989) is a French professional footballer who plays as a midfielder for Blagnac.

Professional career
A prospect from the Grenoble youth system, Fabre played for Tours for six years. He subsequently had stints with Bastia, and Tubize and Oud-Heverlee Leuven in Belgium.

In January 2019, he moved to RWDM.

References

External links
 
 

1989 births
People from Rodez
Sportspeople from Aveyron
Living people
French footballers
Association football midfielders
Tours FC players
CA Bastia players
A.F.C. Tubize players
Oud-Heverlee Leuven players
RWDM47 players
Blagnac FC players
Ligue 2 players
Championnat National 3 players
Championnat National players
Challenger Pro League players
French expatriate footballers
Expatriate footballers in Belgium
French expatriate sportspeople in Belgium
Footballers from Occitania (administrative region)